Porth Community School is a Community School located in the county borough of Rhondda Cynon Taf, Wales. The school was formed in 1973 by the amalgamation of two leading grammar schools, Porth County Girls and Porth County Boys, along with the amalgamation of the Secondary Modern Schools of Llwyncelyn, Trealaw and Ynyshir. Porth is now described as a good school and the previous Porth Infants and Porth Juniors schools have all moved to the Porth Community School to form the new school. Children of various ages attend the school, ranging from 3–16 years old.

History. Nothing to do with the above school, entirely different schools in different areas.

The origins of the school dates back to the creation of ‘Porth Higher Elementary School’ in 1904. The school catered for 240 pupils under the headmaster ship of John Stradling Grant. The school wasn't opened to the public until 19 January 1905. After a tour of the school, the ceremony was performed by Mr W. E. Thomas (the chairman of the ‘Rhondda Education Committee’) in the absence of Mr W. G. Howell (the ‘Director of Education’) due to ill-health. At the time the vast majority of children in the Rhondda were born into poverty. There was a great deal of controversy over providing further education in the Rhondda. Tom John (editor of the ‘Rhondda Leader’ and the first Welshman to become president of the ‘National Union of Teachers’) said that "there was a laborious effort made by several speakers at the meeting [the opening ceremony] to dissipate the fear that this splendid institution would work serious opposition and injury to the county school nearby". The school was built to cater for pupils between the ages of ten and fifteen years-old, but there were many problems from the start. From as late as 1915, school inspectors found students aged nineteen to still be attending the institution.

After the death of headmaster John Stradling Grant in 1914, Richard Chalke took over as head of the school. At the same time the school was merged with the ‘Pupil Teachers College’, where once a week students would take turns in teaching their peers. This was done by pupils to gain entrance into teacher training colleges and become teachers themselves.

In 1922 the school became officially recognised as a secondary school. Then between 1946 and 1947, the name of the school was changed to ‘Porth Secondary Grammar School’. Sometime between 1951 and 1954 the name of the school was changed again to ‘Porth County Grammar Mixed School’. At some point in time the grammar school was split in two sections, one half being known as ‘Porth County Girls’ and the other half being known as ‘Porth County Boys’.  

PORTH COUNTY. (not Porth County Girls/Boys as above)

In 1961, Vernon Owen Jones became headmaster of 'Porth County Grammar School for Boys'. Jones was born in Llwynypia. the son of Daniel and Violet Thomas, and attended Tonypandy Grammar School. He obtained his first BA honours degree in history at Cardiff University (to be followed by two other degrees, a BSc Econ and an MEd), and did his teachers training at 'Porth County Grammar School for Boys'. He was initially an English and History teacher at the school, then head of the History department, and eventually headmaster of the school. During his time at the school, Jones was affectionately known as 'Santos' by the pupils, due to his Mexican "demeanor" and "moustache". His eccentric behaviour was well known at the school, and although he was strict at times, his pupils described him as "fair". Jones was headmaster from 1961 to 1984, and saw the amalgamation of the 'Porth County Girls' and 'Porth County Boys' grammar schools (along with the Secondary Modern Schools of Llwyncelyn, Trealaw and Ynyshir) into what is now known as 'Porth County Community School'. He retired from the school in 1984, and after retiring, he wrote a number of books about Porth, including one about his experiences as headmaster at 'Porth County'.

Present day

2003 demolition
After six to seven weeks of preparation, a demolition team reduced parts of the 'upper school' to a pile of rubble during the weekend of 31 May to 1 June 2003, with site clearance taking place within the subsequent weeks following the demolition.

Substance misuse in the school
In November 2003, an investigation found that steroid use in South Wales was on the rise in teenagers. More disturbingly, The Guardian discovered that the use of steroids was "spreading" from the gym to the playground. The Guardian went on to say that staff at 'Porth County Community School' had "caught young teenagers" using steroids at the school, and on one occasion, found steroids on the school premises. Steve Bowden (the school headteacher at the time) commented: "It is becoming more apparent now. It seems to come from a macho gym culture. The boys who are taking the drugs are not top sportsmen, they are just looking for respect in their communities and for whatever reason are turning to the gym and sometimes steroids."

Michael Sheen visit
On 18 May 2009 acclaimed Welsh actor Michael Sheen spoke with members of the schools film club. All of the students that met the actor were members of 'Filmclub' (a Film Agency of Wales and Skillset Screen Academy Wales initiative to give children access to thousands of "classic film titles"). Porth County Community School is part of 'Filmclub' along with schools in the Tonypandy and Treorchy areas, and it is implemented through the schools "E3 after-school projects". Rachel Evans (the schools former English teacher and 'Filmclub' co-ordinator) said that "it ('Filmclub') gives the pupils a chance to discuss the films they watch". During his visit, Michael Sheen spoke with the pupils and told them that he was "saddened" by the lack of funding for drama schools and clubs throughout Wales.

New School
At the start of 2016, Rhondda Cynon Taff council released a statement saying that they will be spending £80 million on making a 'super school' This would be for Porth county community school and Tonypandy community college. The Process of making this has already starting at the start of 2017 and should be finished mid 2018.

Notable former pupils
 Chris Evans – A British politician and member of parliament for Islwyn. Evans grew up in Wattstown and attended Porth County Community School (then known as 'Porth County Comprehensive School'), before studying for his A-levels at 'Pontypridd College'.
 Mako Vunipola – A New Zealand born rugby union player. Vunipola spent a part of his childhood in Wales and attended Porth County Community School. Vunipola later attended West Monmouth School.
 Andrew King – Professor of English Literature.

Possible school closure
Along with eleven other schools (three secondary and eight primary schools) in the surrounding areas, 'Porth County Community School' could face closure. The Rhondda Cynon Taff council has said that the school closures would be part of their proposed £75 million investment, which they say would provide "improved educational facilities" and "opportunities" for nearly 7,000 children.

References

1973 establishments in Wales
Educational institutions established in 1973
Secondary schools in Rhondda Cynon Taf